Kao Kuang-chi (born 9 March 1950) is a Taiwanese politician. He was a retired admiral of the Republic of China Navy, and later entered the cabinet as Minister of National Defense from 2015 to 2016.

He was the acting Minister of National Defense from 7 August 2013 after the sudden resignation of Defense Minister Andrew Yang, just six days after taking his office after the previous Defense Minister Kao Hua-chu's resignation due to the controversial death of Corporal Hung Chung-chiu.

Kao Kuang-chi was succeeded by Yen Ming after his official appointment by the Executive Yuan on 8 August 2013. Kao Kuang-chi replaced Yen as the ROC Chief of the General Staff on 8 August 2013.

Kao submitted his resignation on 8 April due to the Boeing AH-64 Apache scandal in Taiwan. However, his resignation was rejected by President Ma Ying-jeou.

Minister of National Defense
Kao was inaugurated as the Minister of National Defense on 30 January 2015 in a ceremony presided by Minister without Portfolio Lin Junq-tzer in Taipei. During the handover ceremony, Lin praised his predecessor accomplishments during Yen's tenure in pushing for a complete military judicial system reforms and for better protecting human rights protection of military personnel.

References

Republic of China Navy admirals
Living people
1950 births
Taiwanese Ministers of National Defense